Majed Naser Humaid Bakheit (born 1 April 1984) is an Emirati footballer who plays as a goalkeeper for Shabab Al-Ahli in UAE Football League. He was called to United Arab Emirates national football team at 2007 and 2011 and 2015 AFC Asian Cups.

Early life
Majed Naser was born in Fujairah, UAE.

Controversies
He has a reputation of being short-tempered which caused him to have a history of on-pitch assault that often exposes him to lengthy suspensions. Among them: In 2001, while playing for the youth team of Fujairah SC, he was sentenced to a one-year suspension and a fine of 6,000 Dirhams for verbally and physically assaulting the referee, and throwing a rock at the assistant referee during his team's Cup Match against Al Shabab Club. In 2007, In the season's first League Match against Al Jazira Club, Majed assaulted the assistant referee, Saeed Al Hoti. He was then sentenced to a 13-match ban and a 10,000 Dirhams fine. It was reduced later by the Appeal Committee to 5 matches only. In 2011, a single match ban and 1,000 Dirhams fine were imposed on Majed Naser for throwing one of the chairs scattered around the pitch during a League match against Al Wahda FC. In 2012, Majed received a 17-match ban and was fined 30,000 Dirhams after slapping Ahli Dubai's coach Quique Flores after the semi-final of the Etisalat Cup. Majed announced his retirement of football following the ban sentence, but has changed his mind later. In 2012, Majed had been suspended by his club for the entire 2012–13 season following a red card for butting an opponent in a defeat by Al Muharraq SC.

References

External links 
 
 

1984 births
Living people
Emirati footballers
Fujairah FC players
Al-Wasl F.C. players
Al Ahli Club (Dubai) players
Shabab Al-Ahli Club players
United Arab Emirates international footballers
2007 AFC Asian Cup players
2011 AFC Asian Cup players
2015 AFC Asian Cup players
UAE First Division League players
UAE Pro League players
People from the Emirate of Fujairah
Association football goalkeepers